Warnes  may refer to:

People
 Christopher Warnes, academic
 Geoffrey Warnes, (1914-1944) RAF Squadron Leader
 Fred Warnes, (b.1915) an English professional footballer
 Ignacio Warnes, (1772-1816) an Argentine soldier
 Jennifer Warnes, (b.1947) an American singer
 Manuel Antonio Warnes, (1727–1802) Spanish soldier
 Mary Jane Warnes, (1877-1959, aka Mary Jane Fairbrother) Australian women's activist
 Reuben Charles Warnes, (1875-1961) boxing middleweight champion who participated in the 1908 Olympics
 Thomas Walter Warnes, (b.1938), English gastroenterologist

Locations
 Ignacio Warnes Province
 Warnes River
 Warnes (Santa Cruz), Bolivia

Miscellaneous
 Deportivo Warnes, a Bolivian football team
 Sport Boys Warnes, a Bolivian football team

See also
 Warn (disambiguation)
 Warne (disambiguation)